St Angela's College, Cork is a non-fee paying girls secondary school catering for students between the ages of 12-19 around Cork city and the surrounding areas. The school has a Catholic ethos under the trusteeship of the Ursuline Sisters.

Academic
The school operates the usual courses for the Junior Certificate, Transition Year and Leaving Certificate with the subjects:

Religion, Gaeilge, English, Maths, History, Geography, French, Science, Physical Education, Music, Accounting, German, Business Studies, Art, Home Economics – Social & Scientific, Music, Applied Maths, Physics, Chemistry, Biology.

History
St. Angela's College was founded in 1887 to educate the girls in Cork city. The school was a foundation from the earlier Ursuline Convent in Blackrock, Cork at the request of Bishop O’Callaghan. It was initially based in a former police station on St. Patrick's Hill. The first student was Mary Ryan, later the first woman university professor in Ireland or Great Britain. The high uptake of places in the school meant that building began immediately and the new school building was opened the following year.

St. Joseph's, a single storey building on the grounds was added to as it was intended to serve the third level section of the school. Since there was difficulty in girls attending University, although they could get a degree from the Royal University of Ireland, a degree course location was needed outside of Dublin or Belfast. Other courses which were provided for the older students post secondary school were around Teacher Training, Secretarial Skills and Home Economics. It was one of only five colleges for women in Ireland in 1895. Once the National University of Ireland was implemented in 1908 and the Queen's university became University College Cork, the third level aspect of the school was no longer required. However the secondary school retains this in the full name of the school, St. Angela’s College and High School.

Alumni of note

 Tilly Fleischmann (1882 – 1967) an Irish pianist, organist, pedagogue and writer
 Mary MacSwiney (1872 – 1942) was arrested as part of the Easter Rising events in 1916. She had been a maths teacher at the school
 Mary Ryan,(1873 – 1961) Language professor in University College Cork, first female professor in Ireland or the UK.
 Mabel Lethbridge (1900 – 1968) an English writer and Great War munitions worker, the youngest person to have been awarded a British Empire Medal
 Bridget Flannery (born 1959) an Irish painter working in abstract painting
 Linda Doyle (1968 – ) an electrical and electronic engineer, since 2021 the 45th Provost of Trinity College Dublin

References

Further reading

Secondary schools in County Cork
1887 establishments in Ireland
Buildings and structures in County Cork
Girls' schools in the Republic of Ireland